Michael Stich was the defending champion, but chose to compete at Queen's in the same week.

Arnaud Boetsch won the title by defeating Wally Masur 3–6, 6–3, 6–3 in the final.

Seeds

Draw

Finals

Top half

Bottom half

References

External links
 Official results archive (ATP)
 Official results archive (ITF)

Rosmalen Grass Court Championships
1993 ATP Tour